Maria Sharapova was the two-time defending champion, and successfully defended her title, defeating Ana Ivanovic in the final, 3–6, 6–4, 6–1.

Seeds 
The top four seeds receive a bye into the second round.

 Agnieszka Radwańska (quarterfinals)
 Simona Halep (second round)
 Petra Kvitová (second round)
 Angelique Kerber (second round)
 Jelena Janković (semifinals)
 Maria Sharapova (champion)
 Dominika Cibulková (withdrew because of an Achilles injury)
 Sara Errani (semifinals)
 Ana Ivanovic (final)

Draw

Finals

Top half

Bottom half

Qualifying

Seeds

Qualifiers

Lucky losers

Draw

First qualifier

Second qualifier

Third qualifier

Fourth qualifier

Notes

References

External links
 Main draw
 Qualifying draw

Porsche Tennis Grand Prix Singles
2014 Women's Singles